The Kiribati national basketball team are the basketball side that represent Kiribati in international competitions. They competed at the 2015 Pacific Games, where they finished with an 0–4 record.

Performance at the Pacific Games

2015 - 9th place

References

External links
 Kiribati Basketball Federation

Men's national basketball teams
Basketball